The 2018 Norwegian Football Cup Final was the final match of the 2018 Norwegian Football Cup, the 113th season of the Norwegian Football Cup, the premier Norwegian football cup competition organized by the Football Association of Norway (NFF). The match was played on 2 December 2018 at the Ullevaal Stadion in Oslo, and opposed two Eliteserien sides Rosenborg and Strømsgodset. Rosenborg defeated Strømsgodset 4–1 to claim the Norwegian Cup for a twelfth time in their history and equaled Odd's record number of cup titles.

Route to the final

(ES) = Eliteserien team
(D1) = 1. divisjon team
(D2) = 2. divisjon team
(D3) = 3. divisjon team
(D4) = 4. divisjon team

Match

Details

See also
2018 Norwegian Football Cup
2018 Eliteserien
2018 1. divisjon
2018 in Norwegian football

References

External links 
 Cup final at altomfotball.no

2018
Rosenborg BK matches
Strømsgodset Toppfotball matches
Football Cup
Sports competitions in Oslo
December 2018 sports events in Europe
2010s in Oslo
Final